Go-Kart Records is an independent record label specializing in punk rock located in New York City that was most active from 1995 to 2005.  It also has a European division in Mannheim, Germany.

History 
In its May 1999 issue, Guitar World magazine listed Go-Kart as one of the "twelve most influential forces in punk rock today" along with Epitaph Records, Ian MacKaye, Jello Biafra and NOFX.

In 2003 the label released the first commercially available MP3 CdD entitled the "Go-kart MP300 Raceway."  All-music called the release a, "revolution in a jewel case."  It contained 300 songs from 150 bands and included an MP3 player and instructions on how to burn the songs to CD.

In 2004, the company opened an office in Los Angeles and started an offshoot division to release independent films under the moniker Go-kart Films.  The Los Angeles office closed in 2008.

From 2006–2007, label owner Greg Ross hosted a show entitled Radio Free Greg on Punk Radio Cast (punkradiocast.com) that was the station's most popular show and one of the most listened to shows on the Internet.

As of 2012, the label has slowed down, occasionally releasing music under the Go-Kart imprint as well as its pop-punk imprint Kid Tested Records.

Artists

Go-Kart
Artists that appeared on Go-kart releases (full-lengths, EPs and 7"s --- does not include artists that appeared only on compilations)

 46 Short
 4Ft Fingers
 Amazombies
 Anti-Flag
 Bambix
 Banner Pilot
 Berserk
 Black Army Jacket
 Black Velvet Flag
 Boris The Sprinkler
 Brothers Of Conquest
 Buttsteak
 Buzzcocks
 Candy Snatchers
 Canned Travolta
 Capture The Flag
 Conflict 
 Cougars
 Daycare Swindlers
 Doc Hopper
 Down By Law
 GBH
 Guff
 Hagfish
 Hemlock 
 I Farm
 Icons Of Filth
 INDK
 IRA
 Jett Brando
 Lunachicks
 Manda And The Marbles
 The Menzingers
 Misery
 Parasites
 Pigmy Love Circus
 Pinkerton Thugs
 Plan A Project
 Pseudo Heroes
 Randy's Ripcord
 RIFU
 Sexpod
 Shake Appeal 
 Sick On The Bus
 Southport
 Star Strangled Bastards
 Stress Magnets
 Sweet Diesel
 Ten Foot Pole
 The Control
 The Meatmen
 The Shocker
 The Spades
 The Templars
 The Voluptuous Horror of Karen Black
 Token Entry
 Toxic Narcotic
 Transmission0
 Trick Babys
 Two Man Advantage
 Underdog
 Varukers
 Vision of Disorder
 Weston
 Wives

Go-Kart Europe
Artists Released on Go-kart Europe (full-lengths, EPs and 7"s --- does not include artists that appeared only on compilations)
 Bambix 
 Dr. Norton 
 Duesenjaeger 
 Go Faster Nuns 
  
 Malkovich 
 Nervous Nellie  
 Olehole  
 Rifu  
 The Shocker  
 The Very Job Agency 
 World/Inferno Friendship Society

Compilations 
 Brats On The Beat: Ramones for Kids 
 Destroy Television VHS
 Double Exposure
 Expose Yourself
 Go-Kart vs. the Corporate Giant 
 Go-Kart vs. the Corporate Giant 2
 Go-Kart vs. the Corporate Giant 3
 Go-Kart vs. the Corporate Giant 4
 NY's Hardest 3
 Over Exposed
 Pop Punk's Not Dead
 Punk Uprisings 2
 Skippy Zine/ CD
 Soundtrack to Troma's Terror Firmer
 Step on a Crack Vol.2
 The Go-kart MP300 Raceway
 Twisted TV DVD
 Welcome To The Altamont Speedway 7"
 Your Scene Sucks

Advocacy 
The label is an outspoken critic of the Recording Industry Association of America (RIAA), arguing that the association uses ineffective and heavy-handed business tactics and does not fulfill its claims to represent the music industry. In contrast to the RIAA, the label promotes music downloads, arguing that they help consumers sample music before buying. It has released five albums and numerous single songs for free download on its webpage.

See also 
 List of record labels

References

External links 
 Official site
 Go-Kart Europe site
 Go-Kart Films site
 An Open Letter from Go-Kart Records to the RIAA
 Downhill Battle's interview with Greg Ross, owner of Go-Kart Records
 IndieHQ interview with Go-kart founder Greg Ross

American independent record labels
Punk record labels